Punta Arenas is a barrio in the island-municipality of Vieques, Puerto Rico. Its population in 2010 was 0.

History
Puerto Rico was ceded by Spain in the aftermath of the Spanish–American War under the terms of the Treaty of Paris of 1898 and became an unincorporated territory of the United States. In 1899, the United States Department of War conducted a census of Puerto Rico finding that the combined population of Punta Arenas, Puerto Ferro and Puerto Diablo barrios was 879.

See also

 List of communities in Puerto Rico
 List of barrios and sectors of Vieques, Puerto Rico

References

Barrios of Vieques, Puerto Rico